General Robert Dalzell (1662–1758, sometimes spelt Dalziel) was a Scottish officer in the British Army.  He saw action in many of the Duke of Marlborough's campaigns.

Dalzell married Anna Maria Gibson, the daughter of Sir John Gibson.  They had a son, Gibson Dalzell.

He was promoted to be general of foot on 24 March 1747.

References

External links

1662 births
1758 deaths
British Army generals
British Army personnel of the War of the Spanish Succession